Estonia–Sweden relations are foreign relations between Estonia and Sweden.

History 
Estonia was wholly or partially under Swedish rule between 1561 and 1721.

In 1944, Sweden became one of the first among the few countries to recognize the Soviet occupation of the Baltic countries. In 1945, Stockholm extradited to the Soviet Union around 170 Waffen-SS-soldiers from the Baltic countries who had fled the Red Army and found refuge in Sweden. On 15 August 2011, Swedish Prime Minister Fredrik Reinfeldt officially apologized to the prime ministers of Estonia, Latvia and Lithuania in a ceremony in Stockholm saying that "Sweden owes its Baltic neighbours a "debt of honour" for turning a blind eye to post-war Soviet occupation" and speaking of "a dark moment" in his country's history. Sweden re-recognized Estonia on 27 August 1991.

Estonia has an embassy in Stockholm and 5 honorary consulates (in Eskilstuna, Gothenburg, Karlskrona, Malmö and Visby). Sweden has an embassy in Tallinn and 2 honorary consulates (in Narva and Tartu).

Both countries are full members of the Council of the Baltic Sea States and of the European Union.

Bilateral visits 
Since Estonia's independence, there have been many visits between leaders and senior officials from the two countries. In the last few years, the most important were:

To Sweden:
 January 2005 – Prime Minister of Estonia Juhan Parts
 May 2005 – Estonian Minister of Foreign Affairs Urmas Paet
 October 2005 – President of Estonia Arnold Rüütel
 August 2006 – Estonian Minister of Foreign Affairs Urmas Paet
 November 2006 – President of Estonia Toomas Hendrik Ilves
 September 2007 – President of Estonia Toomas Hendrik Ilves
To Estonia:
 1925 - King Gustaf V
 1932 - Crown Prince Gustaf VI Adolf
April 1992 – King Carl XVI Gustaf and Queen Silvia of Sweden 
2002 – King Carl XVI Gustaf and Queen Silvia of Sweden 
February 2006 – Swedish Foreign Minister Laila Freivalds 
November 2006 – Swedish Foreign Minister Carl Bildt
 October 2007 – Queen Silvia of Sweden
 November 2007 – Prime Minister of Sweden Fredrik Reinfeldt

See also
Foreign relations of Estonia
Foreign relations of Sweden
Swedish Estonia
Swedish Livonia
Estonian Swedes
Estonian Swedish

References

Citations

External links 
  Estonian Ministry of foreign Affairs about the relation with Sweden
  Estonian embassy in Stockholm
  Sweden embassy in Tallinn

 
Sweden
Bilateral relations of Sweden